Kenneth Joseph Riley, OBE (born 25 June 1940) was the Dean of Manchester in the last decade of the 20th century and the first of the 21st. 

Born on 25 June 1940, he was educated at Aberystwyth University and Linacre College, Oxford. He was ordained in 1965 and began his ministry as a curate at Emmanuel Church, Fazakerley. After this he was chaplain at Brasted Place College, then Oundle School and finally Liverpool University. From 1987 to 1993 he was precentor at Liverpool Cathedral when he was elevated to the deanery. He was appointed an OBE in the 2003 New Year Honours List and retired in 2005.

Notes

1940 births
Living people
Alumni of Aberystwyth University
Alumni of Linacre College, Oxford
Deans of Manchester
Officers of the Order of the British Empire